Charity Island, also known as Big Charity Island, is the largest island in Saginaw Bay, in the Michigan waters of Lake Huron. It is part of Whitney Township, in Arenac County. The island also contains an 11-acre (0.04 km²) pond, literally a 'lake within a lake', fed by springs.

The island was named by lake mariners for its location, placed 'through the charity of God' at the entrance to Saginaw Bay midway between the city of Au Gres, Michigan and "The Thumb". The islands were not known as the Charity Islands until after 1845. Maps before 1800 show the islands unnamed. According to an 1839 map, Big Charity Island was referred to as Shawangunk, while Little Charity Island was known as Ile de Traverse.
 
The island is largely forested, mainly with mixed hardwoods. The humid ecoclimate is friendly to a diverse herbarium, including some rare plant species.  Its isolated beaches and unique hardwood forest provides excellent habitat for a variety of plants and animals. Many rare and protected species of plants grow on the Island including Pitcher's thistle, acres of Trillium, Jack in the Pulpit, and Pink Lady Slippers. The island is best known among mariners for its former lighthouse. Charity Island Light was constructed in 1857. It operated in 1857-1930 and was then replaced by the Gravelly Shoal Light.

The island was offered for sale in 1987 for $750,000. In 1993 it was purchased by Standish real estate broker Robert Wiltse and other investors with plans consisting of 24 large houses. After accepting 15 deposits and constructing a harbor, Wiltse changed his mind about the development. In 1997, he sold more than 80% of the island to the U.S. Fish and Wildlife Service as an addition to the Michigan Islands National Wildlife Refuge (MINWR) system, and a few acres to The Nature Conservancy (which also bought the lighthouse from the government).

Geologically, the island contains pockets of chert that are believed to have been quarried by Native Americans. Offshore, the gravel reefs to the south creates a shallow-water channel separating Charity Island from its smaller neighbor, Little Charity Island. The area between the two islands is a favorite spot for fishing. On the northeast end of the island, a small bay is lined with limestone bedrock, offering good holding ground as a place to anchor during storms. The harbor of refuge is accessible by small boat, though access is controlled by the U.S. Fish and Wildlife Service.

Tours of the island (and even dinner cruises) are available. They include the privately owned, rebuilt Charity Island Lightlightkeeper's house and a passing view of Gravelly Shoal Light. They are available from a ferry company in Au Gres, Michigan on the mainland, south of Tawas.

References

External links
Charity Island Webpage
Michigan Islands National Wildlife Refuge
Charity Island Lighthouse - United States Lighthouses

National Wildlife Refuges in Michigan
Protected areas of Arenac County, Michigan
Islands of Lake Huron in Michigan
Islands of Arenac County, Michigan
Saginaw Bay